Óli B. Jónsson (18 November 1918 – 8 February 2005) was an Icelandic football manager and former player. He managed the Icelandic national team in 1951, 1958 and 1960.

He also coached KR, Keflavík, Valur, UMF Selfoss.

References

1918 births
2005 deaths
Oli Jonsson
Oli Jonsson
Oli Jonsson
Oli Jonsson
Oli Jonsson
Oli Jonsson
Oli Jonsson
Oli Jonsson

Association footballers not categorized by position